Olympique Gymnaste Club Nice Côte d'Azur, commonly referred to as OGC Nice or simply Nice, is a French professional football club based in Nice. The club was founded in 1904 and currently plays in Ligue 1, the top tier of French football. Nice plays its home matches at the Allianz Riviera.

Nice was founded under the name Gymnaste Club de Nice and is one of the founding members of the first division of French football. The club has won Ligue 1 four times, the Trophee des Champions one time and the Coupe de France three times. It achieved most of its honours in the 1950s with the club being managed by coaches such as Numa Andoire, Englishman William Berry, and Jean Luciano. The club's last honour was winning the Coupe de France in 1997 after defeating Guingamp 4–3 on penalties in the final. Nice's colours are red and black.

During the club's successful run in the 1950s, Nice were among the first French clubs to successfully integrate internationals players into the fold. Notable players include Héctor De Bourgoing, Pancho Gonzales, Victor Nurenberg, and Joaquín Valle, the latter being the club's all-time leading goalscorer and arguably greatest player.

History 

Gymnaste Club 'Azur was founded in the residential district of Les Baumettes on 9 July 1904 under the name Gymnaste Club. The club was founded by Marquis de Massingy d'Auzac, who served as president of the Fédération Sportive des Alpes-Maritimes (Alpes-Maritimes Sporting Federation). Akin to its name, the club primarily focused on the sports of gymnastics and athletics. On 6 July 1908, in an effort to remain affiliated with the FSAM and also join the amateur federation USFSA, the head of French football at the time, Gymnaste Club de Nice split into two sections with the new section of the club being named Gymnastes Amateurs Club de Nice. The new section spawned a football club and, after two seasons, the two clubs merged. On 20 September 1919, Nice merged with local club Gallia Football Athlétic Club and, subsequently, adopted the club's red and black combination. In 1920, the club was playing in the Ligue du Sud-Est, a regional league under the watch of the French Football Federation. While playing in the league, Nice developed rivalries with Cannes and Marseille. On 22 December 1924, the club changed its name to Olympique Gymnaste Club de Nice.

In July 1930, the National Council of the French Football Federation voted 128–20 in support of professionalism in French football. Nice, along with most clubs from southern France, were among the first clubs to adopt the new statute and subsequently became professional and were founding members of the new league. In the league's inaugural season, Nice finished seventh in its group. In the following season, Nice finished 13th and were relegated from the league. The club did not play league football in the ensuing season and returned to French football in 1936 playing in Division 2. Nice spent the next three years playing in the second division. In 1939, professional football in France was abolished due to World War II. Nonetheless, Nice continued to play league football under amateur status with the club participating in the Ligue du Sud-Est in 1939 and the Ligue du Sud in the following seasons.

After World War II, Nice returned to professional status and were inserted back into the second division. The club achieved promotion back to the first division for the 1948–49 season under the leadership of the Austrian manager Anton Marek. After two seasons of finishing in the top ten, Nice, now led by manager Jean Lardi, achieved its first-ever honour by winning the league title in the 1950–51 season. Led by French internationals Marcel Domingo, Antoine Bonifaci, Abdelaziz Ben Tifour, and Jean Courteaux, as well as the Argentine duo of Pancho Gonzales and Luis Carniglia and the Swede Pär Bengtsson, Nice won the league despite finishing equal on points with Lille. Nice was declared champions due to having more wins (18) than Lille (17). In the following season, under new manager Numa Andoire, Nice won the double after winning both the league and the Coupe de France. In the league, the club defended its title by holding off both Bordeaux and Lille. In the Coupe de France final, Nice faced Bordeaux and defeated the Aquitaine club 5–3 courtesy of goals from five different players.

Nice continued its solid run in the decade by winning the Coupe de France for the second time in 1954. The club, now being led by a young and unknown Just Fontaine, faced southern rivals Marseille and earned a 2–1 victory with Victor Nuremberg and Carniglia scoring the goals. Carniglia retired from football after the season and began managing Nice. In his first season in charge, Nice won the league for a third time after being chased for the entire season by rivals Marseille and Monaco, as well as Lens and Saint-Étienne. After the campaign, Fontaine departed the club for Stade de Reims. Three seasons later, Nice won the last title of the decade in 1959. The club finished the decade (1950–1959) with four league titles and two Coupe de France trophies. Nice also appeared in European competition for the first time in the 1956–57 season, losing to Real Madrid in the quarter-finals.

In subsequent decades, Nice struggled to equal the success of the 1950s with Reims and, later Saint-Étienne eclipsing the club in the 1960s and '70s. During this time, Nice regularly competed in Division 1 with the exception of two seasons in Division 2 in 1965 and 1970. In 1973 and 1976, Nice achieved a second-place finish in the league, its best finish since winning the league in 1959. However, following the latter finish, the club finished in lower positions in the next six seasons and were relegated in the 1981–82 season after finishing 19th. Nice played three seasons in the second division before returning to the top flight in 1985. After six seasons of mid-table finishes, Nice was back in Division 2.

In 1997, Nice, now back in the first division, stunned many after winning the Coupe de France. However, the victory did not shock most French football enthusiasts mainly due to the club's competition in the run up to the final in which Nice faced only Division 2 clubs, save for first division club Bastia. In the final, Nice defeated Guingamp 5–4 on penalties to earn cup success. On a sourer note, Nice were relegated from the first division only days after winning the Coupe de France in dead last in the league. The club spent five seasons in Ligue 2 and returned to Ligue 1 for the 2001–02 season. In the lead up to the season, Nice failed to meet the financial requirements set by the DNCG and was subsequently relegated to the Championnat National, the third level of French football. However, after achieving stability, mainly due to selling a few players, Nice was allowed in Ligue 1 after successfully appealing. In the 2005–06 season, Nice made it to the final of the Coupe de la Ligue in 2006, losing to Nancy 2–1.

In 2016, a Chinese and American consortium led by Chien Lee and Alex Zheng purchased 80% of the club.  In the 2016–17 Ligue 1 season, Nice finished third in the final standings and qualified for the third round of the UEFA Champions League.

On June 11, 2018, Patrick Vieira was announced as Nice manager, replacing Lucien Favre. In the 2018–19 season, Nice finished in 7th place on the table.

In July 2019, it was announced that Jim Ratcliffe acquired the French club for a reported €100 million.

After a run of poor form saw Nice sitting at 11th place in Ligue 1 and eliminated from the Europa League, manager Patrick Vieira was sacked. Vieira's assistant, Adrian Ursea, took over as caretaker.  Nice would finish the 2020–21 Ligue 1 season in ninth place on the table.

On 28 June 2021, Christophe Galtier was appointed as the new head coach. On 27 June 2022, Lucien Favre returned to Nice as manager.

After a complicated first part of the season, Lucien Favre was fired. He was replaced by the coach of the reserve team Didier Digard

Home stadium 

From 1927 until 2013, Nice played its home matches at the Stade Municipal du Ray, usually shortened to simply the Stade du Ray. The stadium is, however, officially known as the Stade Léo-Lagrange, named after a French politician who had a stint in politics as the assistant secretary of state for sport. The Stade du Ray has gone through many renovations, most recently being in 1997 and has a capacity of 17,415. The stadium was popular with supporters for being located in the centre of the city, but suffered from its old structure and small capacity, as the Nice metropolitan area has over one million residents.

Nice began to attempt to build a new stadium in 2002. In its first attempt, the club was heavily criticised by local politicians who questioned the usefulness and format of the stadium. Despite the critics, however, the club's proposition passed and excavation of the site in the plain of Var, at Nice-Lingostière, began in July 2006. The Tribunal administration of Nice cancelled the project for irregularities committed concerning the fixation of the price of tickets. In October 2008, the new deputy mayor of Nice, Christian Estrosi, declared that Nice would have a new stadium "no later than 2013". The new stadium was to be built at the same place as before, at Nice-Lingostière.

On 22 September 2009, French newspaper L'Équipe reported the Grand Stade Nice had been selected by the French Football Federation (FFF) as 1 of the 12 stadiums to be used in the country's bid to host UEFA Euro 2016. The FFF officially made its selections on 11 November 2009, and the city of Nice was selected as a site to host matches during the tournament.
The construction of the Allianz Riviera started in 2011 and was completed in September 2013.

Players

Current squad 
As of 31 January 2023.

Out on loan

Reserve squad

As of the 2022–23 season

Notable former players 
Below are the notable former players who have represented Nice in league and international competition since the club's foundation in 1904. To appear in the section below, a player must have played in at least 100 official matches for the club.

For a complete list of OGC Nice players, see :Category:OGC Nice players

France
 Marcel Aubour
 Dominique Baratelli
 Éric Bauthéac
 Hatem Ben Arfa
 Daniel Bravo
 André Chorda
 José Cobos
 Carlos Curbelo
 Wylan Cyprien
 Héctor De Bourgoing
 Didier Digard
 Olivier Echouafni
 Patrice Evra
 Valentin Eysseric
 Koczur Ferry
 Jacques Foix
 Just Fontaine
 Jean-Marc Guillou
 Jean-Noël Huck
 Roger Jouve
 Charles Marchetti
 Pierre Lees-Melou
 Hugo Lloris
 Charly Loubet
 Jean Luciano
 Marc Molitor
 Alassane Pléa
 Loïc Rémy
 Malang Sarr
 Joseph Ujlaki

Argentina
 Walter Benítez
 Renato Civelli
 Darío Cvitanich

Brazil
 Ederson

Colombia
 David Ospina

Haiti
 Romain Genevois

Italy
 Mario Balotelli

Ivory Coast
 Bakari Koné
 Jean Michaël Seri

Luxembourg
 Victor Nurenberg

Mali
 Cédric Kanté
 Mahamane Traoré

Portugal
 Ricardo Pereira

Senegal
 Nampalys Mendy

Serbia
 Nemanja Pejčinović

Spain
 Josep Samitier
 Joaquín Valle

Sweden
 Leif Eriksson

Yugoslavia
 Nenad Bjeković
 Marko Elsner
 Josip Katalinski

Management and staff

Club officials 
Senior club staff
Owner(s): Ineos
President: Jean-Pierre Rivère
Director of football: Julien Fournier 
Manager: Didier Digard
Assistant manager: Frédéric Gioria
First-team coach: Arjan Peço
First-team coach: Christophe Moulin
Fitness coach: Nicolas Dyon
Rehab coach: Christopher Juras
Goalkeeping coach: Nicolas Dehon

Coaching history

Honours

Domestic 
 Ligue 1
 Champions (4): 1950–51, 1951–52, 1955–56, 1958–59
Runners-up: 1972–73, 1975–76
 Ligue 2
 Champions (4): 1947–48, 1964–65, 1969–70, 1993–94
Runners-up: 1984–85
 Division 3
 Champions: 1988–89
 Coupe de France
 Champions (3): 1951–52, 1953–54, 1996–97
 Runners-up: 1977–78, 2021–22
 Trophee des Champions
 Champions: 1970
 Runners-up: 1956, 1959, 1997

Other 
Latin Cup
Runners-up (1): 1952

Sponsors

Main Sponsor
  INEOS

Kit Sponsor
  Macron till 2022–23
  Castore starting from 2023–24

References

External links 

 

 
Association football clubs established in 1904
Sport in Nice
1904 establishments in France
Football clubs in Provence-Alpes-Côte d'Azur
Ligue 1 clubs